The Hôtel de Ville is a historic building in Arras, Pas-de-Calais, northern France. It was built in the sixteenth century, and completed in 1517. It was restored in the nineteenth century, and re-dedicated on August 26, 1867 by Emperor Napoleon III. It was then almost completely destroyed in World War 1  and rebuilt during the 1920s, using some modern materials where practicable. This can most obviously be seen inside the tower, where the main supporting structure is concrete. It has been listed as an official national monument since 1921. In 2005, the belfry was added to the UNESCO World Heritage List as part of the Belfries of Belgium and France site because of its architecture and historical importance in maintaining municipal power in Europe.

References

Monuments historiques of Pas-de-Calais
Buildings and structures completed in 1517
City and town halls in France
1517 establishments in France